Birling is a small settlement and former civil parish, now in the parish of Warkworth, in the county of Northumberland, England. It is situated immediately to the north of the village of Warkworth on the A1068, separated from Warkworth by the River Coquet. There are facilities for static and touring caravans at Birling. To the east are Warkworth Golf Club, Birling Links and beach. In 1951 the parish had a population of 81.

Birling Manor, an 18th-century house, with an extension dated 1752, is a Grade II listed building. The 19th century coach house and 18th century hen house, associated with Birling Manor, are also both listed buildings.

Governance 
Birling is in the parliamentary constituency of Berwick-upon-Tweed. Birling was formerly a township in Warkworth parish, from 1866 Birling was a civil parish in its own right until it was abolished on 1 April 1955 and merged with Warkworth.

References

Hamlets in Northumberland
Former civil parishes in Northumberland
Warkworth, Northumberland